Andrew Black (23 September 1917 – 16 February 1989) was a Scottish footballer, who played as an inside forward. He was born in Stirling.

Black was a prolific scorer with Heart of Midlothian before World War II, scoring 29 goals in 34 games in the 1936–37 season, before finishing as top scorer in the Scottish League with 40 goals in 38 appearances in the following season. He was widely credited the following season as being the first player to score a hat-trick against Rangers at Ibrox;
however this had been first achieved by Willie Wilson, also of Hearts, in October 1915.

Black played as a guest for Chester during the latter stages of the war but the club were unsuccessful in their attempts to sign him permanently.

Black transferred to Manchester City in 1946 and between then and 1950 appeared 139 times and scored 47 goals. In a match during the late 1940s at Maine Road, the Charlton Athletic goalkeeper Sam Bartram sliced a clearance from the edge of his penalty area. Black, stood just inside his own half, headed the ball back over Bartram. City's pitch was 115 yards long so the ball must have travelled nearly sixty yards. He finished his career with Stockport County in 1953.

Black won three caps for the Scotland national football team and six wartime caps, including one game where he had to be carried off of the pitch by Frank Swift after becoming injured.

He died on 16 February 1989 in Bannockburn Hospital.

References

1917 births
Association football inside forwards
Chester City F.C. wartime guest players
Portsmouth F.C. wartime guest players
Shawfield F.C. players
Heart of Midlothian F.C. players
Manchester City F.C. players
Scotland international footballers
Scottish Junior Football Association players
Scottish Football League players
Scottish Football League representative players
Scottish footballers
Footballers from Stirling
Stockport County F.C. players
English Football League players
York City F.C. wartime guest players
Grimsby Town F.C. wartime guest players
Aldershot F.C. wartime guest players
Liverpool F.C. wartime guest players
Crewe Alexandra F.C. wartime guest players
Scotland wartime international footballers
1989 deaths
Scottish league football top scorers